, better known as  or  or , is a Japanese comedian, variety show host, voice actor, film director, and musician. He is a member of the owarai group Garage Sale. He has also appeared in drag as a schoolgirl character named Gorie and collaborated with Jasmine Ann Allen and Joann Yamazaki to release three singles. Mickey reached number one on the Oricon charts in 2004.

Filmography

Television drama 
 Churasan series (2001, 2003, 2004, 2007) - as Keishō Kohagura
 Oniyome nikki series (2005, 2007) - as Kazuma Yamasaki
 Ohitorisama (2009) - as Delivery Man
 Keiji Narusawa Ryō (2009) - as Edo
 Jidan Kōshōnin Gotakeshi (2011) - as Shingo Fujii
 Nobunaga no Chef (2013) as Toyotomi Hideyoshi

Movies 
 Nin x Nin: Ninja Hattori-kun, the Movie (2004) - as Kemumaki Kenzō
 Check It Out, Yo! (2006) - as Hajime Genga
 Memories of Matsuko (2006) - as Shūji Ōkura
 Sakuran (2007) - as one of Ore-tachi
 Utatama (2008) - as Hiroshi Gondō
 Goemon (2009) - as Sarutobi Sasuke

TV shows 
 Waratte Iitomo (2000–2014, Fuji Television)
 Adrena! Gallage (2004–2009, TV Asahi)
 Gori muchū (2007–present, Chūkyō Television Broadcasting)
 Oha Suta (2000–2008, TV Tokyo)
 One Night R&R (2000–2006, Fuji Television)

Anime film 
 Summer Days with Coo (2007) - as Kijimunā

Anime television 
 Kimba the White Lion (2009) - as Gorilla

Japanese dub 
 The Pacifier (2007) - as Shane Wolfe (Vin Diesel)
 G-Force (2009) - as Darwin
 Jack the Giant Slayer (2013) - as General Fallon
 Fantastic Four (2015) - as The Thing

Director 
  (2006, Yoshimoto Kogyo)
  (2007, Yoshimoto Kogyo)
  (2009, Kadokawa Pictures)
  (2018, Phantom Film)

Endorsements 
 Nintendo - Wii Fit
 Asahi Breweries - Chūhai Goricchu

Discography

Singles 
 Mickey (September 8, 2004)
 Pecori♥Night (September 14, 2005)
  (September 10, 2006)

References

External links 
 Garage Sale Gori Official Blog
 

1972 births
Japanese comedians
Japanese male musicians
Japanese male voice actors
Living people
People from Naha
Male voice actors from Okinawa Prefecture
Musicians from Okinawa Prefecture
Japanese comedy musicians